Following is a list of dams and reservoirs in Arkansas.

All major dams are linked below.

Dams and reservoirs in Arkansas 

This list is incomplete.  You can help Wikipedia by expanding it.

 Lake Atalanta Dam, Lake Atalanta, City of Rogers, Arkansas
 Beaver Dam, Beaver Lake, United States Army Corps of Engineers
 Blakely Mountain Dam, Lake Ouachita, USACE
 Blue Mountain Dam, Blue Mountain Lake, USACE
 Bull Shoals Dam, Bull Shoals Lake, USACE
 Carpenter Dam, Lake Hamilton, Entergy
 Lake Conway Dam, Lake Conway, Arkansas Fish and Game Commission
 Dardanelle Lock and Dam, Lake Dardanelle, USACE
 DeGray Dam, DeGray Lake, USACE
 DeQueen Dam, DeQueen Lake, USACE
 Dierks Dam, Dierks Lake, USACE
 Felsenthal Lock and Dam, Lake Jack Lee, USACE
 Lake Fort Smith Dam, Lake Fort Smith, City of Fort Smith, Arkansas
 Galla Creek Dam, Galla Creek Lake, City of Atkins, Arkansas
 Lake Georgia Pacific Dam, Lake Georgia Pacific, Georgia-Pacific
 Gillham Dam, Gillham Lake, USACE
 Greers Ferry Dam, Greers Ferry Lake, USACE
 Little Flint Creek Dam, Lake Flint Creek, Southwestern Electric Power Company
 Millwood Dam, Millwood Lake, USACE
 Narrows Dam, Lake Greeson, USACE
 Nimrod Dam, Nimrod Lake, USACE
 Norfork Dam, Norfork Dam, USACE
 Arthur V. Ormond Lock and Dam, Winthrop Rockefeller Lake, USACE
 Remmel Dam, Lake Catherine, Entergy
 Seven Devils Dam, Seven Devils Lake, Arkansas Fish and Game Commission
 Wilbur D. Mills Dam, unnamed reservoir on the Arkansas River, USACE

References

See also 

 List of Arkansas rivers

 
 
Arkansas
Dams
Dams